Gbenga Tai "Ben" Folami (born 8 June 1999) is an Australian professional footballer who plays as a winger for Melbourne Victory and the Australia national team.

Club career

Ipswich Town

Born in Sydney, Folami joined Ipswich Town's academy in 2015, having previously played for the Football NSW Institute and the Sutherland Sharks at youth level. After working his way through the youth system at Portman Road, he went on to make his full senior debut in a 2–1 defeat against Crystal Palace in the EFL Cup second round on 22 August 2017.  He made his league debut for the club on 2 April 2018 in a 2–2 draw against Millwall. In May 2018, Folami signed a new three-year contract at Ipswich until 2021. On 14 January 2019, Folami tore his achilles tendon during an under-23 match against Cardiff City, ruling him out for the remainder of the season.

Following his recovery from injury Folami appeared for Ipswich’s under-23 side before returning to first-team action on 12 November 2019, starting in a 0–1 away loss to Colchester United in an EFL Trophy group stage match.

Stevenage (loan)
On 31 January 2020, Folami signed for Stevenage on loan until the end of the 2019–20 season. He made his debut on 8 February, coming on as a second-half substitute in a 2–1 loss to Exeter City. He made two substitute appearances for Stevenage before the 2019–20 season was suspended due to the Coronavirus outbreak.

Return to Ipswich Town
He scored his first goal for Ipswich in an EFL Trophy tie against Gillingham on 6 October 2020.

In April 2021, Ipswich announced that Folami would be released at the end of the 2020–21 season following the end of his contract.

Melbourne Victory
On 28 October 2020, Folami joined Australian A-League side Melbourne Victory on loan until the end of the season. He scored his first goal for Melbourne Victory in a 2–2 draw with Thai side Chiangrai United in the AFC Champions League on 30 November.
In July 2021, after being released by Ipswich Town, Folami signed a permanent two-year contract with Melbourne Victory.

International career
Folami is of Nigerian descent. In October 2018, he was called up to the Australia U19 squad to compete in the 2018 AFC U-19 Championship held in Indonesia. He made 4 appearances during the tournament, scoring one goal, as the Young Socceroos exited the U-19 championships at the quarter-final stage. Folami impressed with his performances during the tournament, with Fox Sports describing him as "an absolute revelation" and stating that he had been "Australia's best player".

Folami made his debut for the Australia U23 team in a 2–1 loss to Iran on 14 October 2019. He scored his first goal for the under-23s while winning his second cap, appearing as a second-half substitute and scoring in a 5–1 victory over China on 15 November 2019.

He debuted with the senior Australia national team in a 2–0 2022 FIFA World Cup qualification loss to Japan on 24 March 2022.

Career statistics

International

Honours

Club
Melbourne Victory
FFA Cup: 2021

International
Australia U23
AFC U-23 Asian Cup third place: 2020

References

External links

1999 births
Living people
Soccer players from Sydney
Australian soccer players
Australia international soccer players
Australia youth international soccer players
Australia under-20 international soccer players
Association football forwards
Ipswich Town F.C. players
Stevenage F.C. players
Melbourne Victory FC players
Australian people of Nigerian descent
Australian expatriate soccer players
Australian expatriate sportspeople in England
Expatriate footballers in England
English Football League players